Priya Vadlamani is an Indian actress who appears in Telugu films. She started as a model and competed in Femina Miss India Hyderabad 2016. She later starred in films such as Premaku Raincheck and Husharu.

Early life
Priya Vadlamani was born in a Telugu family in Jabalpur, Madhya Pradesh and brought up in Hyderabad. She studied in Slate the school in Hyderabad. She is a student at Christ College, Bangalore. She started her career as assistant director.

Filmography

References

Year of birth missing (living people)
Living people
Indian female models
Indian film actresses
People from Jabalpur
Actresses in Telugu cinema
Actresses in Tamil cinema

Telugu actresses
Actresses from Madhya Pradesh
21st-century Indian actresses